The Novoolexandrian Draught (Novooleksandrivska Vagovozna) is a Ukrainian breed of draught horse. It shares its early history with the Russian Heavy Draught bred in Imperial Russia in the second half of the nineteenth century, and until after the Russian Revolution known as the Russian Ardennes; later development took place in Ukraine, where it received official recognition in 1999. It was bred for draught work, but it is also reared for meat and particularly for mare's milk, of which it is a high-yielding producer.

History 

The Novoolexandrian Draught initially developed as a sub-type of the Russian Ardennes (later named Russian Heavy Draught), and so shares its early history. From about this time, stallions of the Franco-Belgian Ardennais heavy horse were imported to the Russian Empire from Sweden in increasing numbers; between 1875 and 1915, their number grew from nine to almost six hundred. These were put to local mares; some Brabançon, Percheron and Orlov Trotter blood was also introduced. The aim was to produce a compact draught animal suitable for farm work. The Russian Ardennes was presented at the Exposition Universelle in Paris in 1900. As with other Russian horse breeds, the events of the First World War and the Russian Revolution caused a severe decline in numbers; in 1924, fewer than a hundred Russian Ardennes stallions remained. 

Other horses of the same type were moved there from a collective at Mariupol, in Donetsk Oblast, in 1929, and selective breeding for a compact but powerful draught horse began. In 1970 the Ukrainian or Novoolexandrian type was officially recognised by the Soviet ministry of agriculture. Following the break-up of the Soviet Union and the independence of Ukraine, the Novoolexandrian Draught received official recognition from the Ministry of Agrarian Policy in November 1999.

References 


Horse breeds
Horse breeds originating in Ukraine
Animal breeds originating in the Soviet Union